Irkutsk Aviation Plant is a company based in Irkutsk, Russia and established in 1932. It is a branch of Irkut Corporation, itself part of United Aircraft Corporation. As of 2014, 2,500 people work in the plant.

The Irkutsk Aviation Production Association, one of the oldest defense enterprises of the Transbaykal region, builds the Su-27 Flanker trainer. Since becoming a joint-stock firm it has aggressively sought to expand its civil and consumer product lines while maintaining some aircraft production.

Since its establishment in 1932, the plant has produced over 7,000 aircraft, including the Su-30 and Yak-130. It is also involved in the production of the MC-21 airliner.

References

External links
 Official website

Companies based in Irkutsk
Aircraft manufacturers of Russia
United Aircraft Corporation
Ministry of the Aviation Industry (Soviet Union)
Aircraft manufacturers of the Soviet Union
1932 establishments in the Soviet Union